The Happiest Days of Your Life is a 1950 British comedy film directed by Frank Launder, based on the 1947 play of the same name by John Dighton. The two men also wrote the screenplay. It is one of a stable of classic British film comedies produced by Frank Launder and Sidney Gilliat for British Lion Film Corporation. The film was made on location in Liss and at Riverside Studios, London. In several respects, including some common casting, it was a precursor of the St. Trinian's films of the 1950s and 1960s.

Plot

In September 1949, confusion reigns when St Swithin's Girls' School is accidentally billeted at Nutbourne College: a boys' school in Hampshire. The two heads, Wetherby Pond (Alastair Sim) and Muriel Whitchurch (Margaret Rutherford), try to cope with the ensuing chaos, as the children and staff attempt to live in the newly cramped conditions (it being impossible to share dormitories or other facilities), and seek to prevent the children taking advantage of their new opportunities.

Additional humour is derived from the departure of the Nutbourne College domestic staff and their hurried (and not very effective) replacement with the St Swithin's School Home Economics class.

The main comedy is derived from the fact that the parents of the St Swithin's girls would consider it improper for their daughters to be exposed to the rough mix of boys in Pond's school, and from the consequent need to conceal the fact that the girls are now sharing a school that's full of boys. Pond is offended at the suggestion that his boys are not suitable company for the young ladies of St Swithin's, but he needs to appease Miss Whitchurch to salvage his chances of an appointment to a prestigious all-boys school for which he is in the running, and which depends on his ability to prevent his current post presenting the appearance of a beer garden.

Matters come to a head when a group of school governors, from the prestigious establishment to which Pond has applied to become the next headmaster, pay a visit at the same time as the parents of some of the St Swithin's girls. Frantic classroom changes are made, and hockey, lacrosse and rugby posts and nets are swapped about, as pupils and staff try to hide the unusual arrangement.

Two simultaneous tours of the school premises are arranged: one for the girls' parents, and a separate one for the governors, and never the twain must meet! The facade finally collapses when the parents become obsessed with seeing a girls' lacrosse match at the same time as one of the governors has been promised a rugby match.

The punchline is delivered – a clever swipe at post-war bureaucracy – when, weeks too late, a Ministry of Schools official arrives, to declare everything sorted out. "You're a co-educational school, I believe; well I've arranged for another co-educational school to replace St Swithin's next week... Oh, it appears they're ahead of schedule." At this point, several more coachloads of children and staff appear noisily, and utter chaos reigns.

Fade out on Alastair Sim and Margaret Rutherford, quietly discussing in which remote and unattractive corner of the British Empire they might best try to pick up the pieces of their respective careers, with her mentioning having a brother who "grows groundnuts in Tanganyika."

Cast
 Alastair Sim as Wetherby Pond
 Margaret Rutherford as Miss Whitchurch
 Guy Middleton as Victor Hyde-Brown
 Joyce Grenfell as Miss Gossage
 Edward Rigby as Rainbow
 Muriel Aked as Miss Jezzard
 John Bentley as Richard Tassell
 Bernadette O'Farrell as Miss Harper
 Richard Wattis as Arnold Billings
 Gladys Henson as Mrs. Hampstead
 John Turnbull as Conrad Matthews
 Percy Walsh as Monsieur Joue
 Arthur Howard as Anthony Ramsden
 Harold Goodwin as Edwin
 Laurence Naismith as Dr. Collet
 Stringer Davis as Rev. Rich
 Olwen Brookes as Mrs. Parry
 Russell Waters as Mr. West
 George Benson as Mr. Tripp
 Angela Glynne as Barbara Colhoun
 Keith Faulkner as Unsworth
 George Cole as Junior Assistant Caretaker at Ministry of Education (uncredited)

Reception

Critical
The Monthly Film Bulletin noted an "Uninhibited and energetically handled farce...Occasionally slapdash, but frequently amusing"; and The New York Times called it "witty, warm, sometimes biting and wholly charming."

BFI Screenonline states that Alastair Sim's portrayal of headmaster Wetherby Pond "is one of his greatest creations", but that both he and Margaret Rutherford were "decisively upstaged" by supporting actress Joyce Grenfell, as one of the teaching staff of St Swithin's.

Box Office
The film was successful on its release, being the fifth most popular film and the second-biggest money maker at the British box office for 1950. According to Kinematograph Weekly the 'biggest winners' at the box office in 1950 Britain were The Blue Lamp, The Happiest Days of Your Life, Annie Get Your Gun, The Wooden Horse, Treasure Island and Odette, with "runners up" being Stage Fright, White Heat, They Were Not Divided, Trio, Morning Departure, Destination Moon, Sands of Iwo Jima, Little Women, The Forsythe Saga, Father of the Bride, Neptune's Daughter, The Dancing Years, The Red Light, Rogues of Sherwood Forest, Fancy Pants, Copper Canyon, State Secret, The Cure for Love, My Foolish Heart, Stromboli, Cheaper by the Dozen, Pinky, Three Came Home, Broken Arrow and Black Rose.

Legacy
The Belles of St Trinian's (1954) is a similar comedy about a girls' school at which chaos reigned, which was also produced by Launder and Gilliat and featured several members of the cast of The Happiest Days of Your Life, including Alastair Sim, Joyce Grenfell, George Cole, Richard Wattis and Guy Middleton, with Ronald Searle providing the cartoons for the titles.

References

Bibliography
The Great British Films, pp 142–143, Jerry Vermilye, 1978, Citadel Press,

External links

Jaymes Young – Happiest Year Song Lyrics at Cover Lyrics

1950 films
1950 comedy films
British comedy films
British films based on plays
London Films films
Films with screenplays by Frank Launder and Sidney Gilliat
Films directed by Frank Launder
1950s high school films
Films set in boarding schools
Films set in 1949
British black-and-white films
1950s English-language films
1950s British films